Polysoude is a French welding company headquartered in Nantes. Its Holding Company, GWT Group (Global Welding Technologies), is located in Austria. Founded in 1961, Polysoude designs, manufactures and sells equipment and installations for orbital and mechanised welding as well as cladding. All the welding solutions for arc-welding are proposed. 85% of its turnover is generated abroad.

History 

Polysoude was created in 1961 focusing engineering and development on its first installations for orbital welding. The origin of its creation came from a specific request for the construction of power stations, with technical specifications requiring flawless and repetitive welds in order to guarantee a maximum level of security. Since then subsidiaries and offices now deal with the export market.

Direct Sales Network:
Dates of the creation of subsidiaries and offices: ,

1993 Acquisition of ASTRO ARC POLYSOUDE Inc. In the United States.
2004	POLYSOUDE SHANGHAI Co. Ltd. China.
2005	POLYSOUDE AUSTRIA GmbH Austria.
2006	POLYSOUDE WT 000 Moscow, Russia.
2006	POLYSOUDE SUISSE S.A. Switzerland.
2007	POLYSOUDE ITALIA Spa  Italy.
2009 POLYSOUDE Czech Republic.
2011	POLYSOUDE DEUTSCHLAND GmbH Germany.
2011	POLYSOUDE Brazil.

Industries 
Industries using orbital and mechanised welding:
    
           
Construction of nuclear power plants
Nuclear industry
Boilermaking industry
Construction of heat exchangers 
Petroleum industry (on/off shore)
           
Aviation and Aerospace Industries 
Micro electronics (chip production)
Food industry
Pharmaceutical industry
Chemical industry

References

External links

"French tube fabricator meets volume increase with orbital welding." (Article)

Engineering companies of France
Companies based in Pays de la Loire